Love Synonym Pt.2: Right for Us (stylized as Love Synonym #2: Right for Us) is the second part of the debut extended play by South Korean singer Wonho. It was released by Highline Entertainment and distributed by Kakao M on February 26, 2021. The lead single is "Lose".

Background and release 
Wonho initially announced an upcoming EP in 2020 and performed a song "Flash" at his online concert in September 2020. The title and the release date were confirmed in February 2021. It is the continuation of the series started by his first EP.

A music video for "Lose" was released on the same day as the EP. It was also released in two language versions; English and Korean. For the song "Ain't About You", Wonho collaborated with singer-songwriter Kiiara. For the song "Weneed", Wonho released a special video through his personal YouTube channel on his birthday; the song is named in reference to Wonho's fanbase "Wenee".

Critical reception 

Ruby C of NME gave the EP four stars, saying that it "seems to have found a well-balanced equilibrium in both sound and vibe". P. Claire Dodson described the EP for Teen Vogue as "a delightful, concise EP, especially on tracks like "WENEED", a pretty soft-pop hit with a power-pop chorus that highlights [Wonho's] smooth vocals".

Critic's lists

Track listing

Charts

Album

Weekly charts

Monthly chart

Songs

Weekly charts

Certification and sales

Release history

See also
 List of K-pop songs on the Billboard charts

Notes

References 

Wonho (singer) EPs
Starship Entertainment EPs
Korean-language EPs
2021 EPs